Alexander Brengle Hurd (July 21, 1910 – May 28, 1982) was a Canadian speed skater and Olympic medalist. He won a silver medal and a bronze medal at the 1932 Winter Olympics in Lake Placid.

References

External links

1910 births
1982 deaths
Speed skaters from Montreal
Canadian male speed skaters
Olympic speed skaters of Canada
Speed skaters at the 1932 Winter Olympics
Olympic silver medalists for Canada
Olympic bronze medalists for Canada
Olympic medalists in speed skating
Medalists at the 1932 Winter Olympics
20th-century Canadian people